The Ethiopian Parliament building was built in the early 1930s in Addis Ababa, Ethiopia. Today, the large mosaics of St. George and the Dragon (Ethiopia's Patron Saint) and the two Lions of Judah on either side of him have been painted over, and the gilding that covered the winged lions on the gates has worn away. Although the Derg used the new Shengo Hall (it was the largest pre-fabricated building in the world when it was built) across the street as its parliament, the present government has moved parliament back into this older building.

New building
In 2012, it was announced that a new parliament building would be built. It would be designed by a consortium of the Dutch architectural firms of Treurniet Architectuur and Michiel Clercx Architectuur and the Ethiopian firm of Addis Mebratu and S7 Architects. The design of the building is centered upon three drum-like shapes, symbolising Negarit drums, which were sounded upon the promulgation of imperial decrees. The symbol of the law-making process is transferred to the building's design. The three "drums" will host the House of People's Representatives, House of Federation, and the parliamentary library. Since the site is sloped, below the drums will sit offices for MPs and their staff.

References

Buildings and structures in Addis Ababa
Seats of national legislatures